Results of Rally Catalunya (43º Rally RACC Catalunya - Costa Daurada), 12th round of 2007 World Rally Championship, run on October 5–7.

Results

Retirements 
  Andreas Cortinovis - went off the road (SS1);
  Raphael Auquier - went off the road (SS1);
  Luís Pérez Companc - went off the road (SS2);
  Manfred Stohl - went off the road (SS3);
  Jan Kopecký - went off the road (SS3);
  Patrik Sandell - went off the road (SS6/7);
  Kalle Pinomaki - went off the road (SS8);
  Stefano Benoni - mechanical (SS8);
  Gareth Jones - mechanical (SS8);
  Yeray Lemes - retired (SS14);
  Michał Kościuszko - went off the road (SS15);

Special Stages 
All dates and times are CEST (UTC+2).

Championship standings after the event

Drivers' championship

Manufacturers' championship

External links 

 Results on the official site: WRC.com
 Results on eWRC-results.com
 Results at Jonkka's World Rally Archive

Catalunya
2007
Catalunya Rally